Like Blood Like Honey is the debut studio album by American singer-songwriter Skylar Grey, then known as Holly Brook. It was released by Warner Bros. Records on May 23, 2006. The album peaked at number 26 on Billboard Heatseekers Albums chart.

Track listing

References

2006 debut albums
Skylar Grey albums